Kargahar is a village and corresponding community development block in Rohtas district of Bihar, India. As of 2011, the population of Kargahar was 10,170, in 1,464 households, while the population of Kargahar block was 225,082, in 31,528 households. The nearest city is Sasaram, the district headquarters.

Demographics 

Kargahar is an entirely rural block, with no large urban centres. The sex ratio of the block in 2011 was 908 females to every 1000 males, which was the lowest among rural areas in Rohtas. The sex ratio was higher in the 0-6 age group, with 918 males for every 1000 females. Members of scheduled castes made up 21.02% of the population and members of scheduled tribes made up 0.26%. The literacy rate of Kargahar block was 75.92%, higher than the district rate of 73.37%. There was an 18.71% literacy gender gap in the block, with 84.82% of men but only 66.11% of women able to read and write, a slightly smaller gap than the district gap of 19.91%.

Employment 
A majority of Kargahar block's workforce was engaged in agriculture in 2011, with 31.77% of workers being cultivators who owned or leased their own land and a further 44.45% being agricultural labourers who worked another person's land for wages. 7.13% worked as household industry workers, and the remaining 16.66% were other workers.

Amenities 
Of the 198 inhabited villages in Kargahar block, 143 have schools and 10 have medical facilities. 26 have post offices and 66 have telephone service. 12 have banks and agricultural credit societies. 87 have permanent pucca roads. 151 have electrical power, serving 89.65% of block residents. All 198 villages had access to drinking water, but only 21 of them had tap water (Kargahar itself not being one of them). In the rest, drinking water was mainly supplied via well and hand pump. Kargahar village also has a public library, a community centre with sports fields, a regular mandi, and a weekly haat.

Villages 
Kargahar block has 257 villages, of which 198 are inhabited and 59 are uninhabited:

References 

Villages in Rohtas district